Hans Christian Steffensen (22 December 1837 – 4 September 1912) was a Danish politician, jurist and speaker of the Landsting, a chamber of the parliament.

He was an elected member of the Folketing from 1879 to 1881 and a royally appointed member of the Landsting from 1888, representing the conservative party Højre until 1900 when he was one of nine Højre-members of the Landsting who left the party in a protest against the government's duty and tax reforms and formed the conservative group De Frikonservative in 1902.

Steffensen was Højre's spokesman on the extensive 1895 reform of the order of business of the Landsting, and he was speaker of the Landsting from 1907 to 1909.

Notes

References
Friis, M. P. (1902). "Steffensen, Hans Christian"  in C. F. Bricka (ed.) Dansk Biografisk Lexikon tillige omfattende Norge for Tidsrummet 1537–1814. XVI. bind, Skarpenberg — Sveistrup. Copenhagen: Gyldendal, pp. 358–60.
Engelstoft, P. (1926). "Steffensen, Hans Christian"  in Dahl, Svend; Engelstoft, P. (eds.) Dansk Biografisk Haandleksikon, tredje bind. Copenhagen: Gyldendal, p. 467.
Møller, Jens (1949). "Tingenes forretningsordener"  in Fabricius, Knud; Frisch, Hartvig; Hjelholt, Holger; Mackeprang, M.; Møller, Andr. (eds.) Den Danske Rigsdag 1849–1949. Bind IV: Rigsdagens arbejdsmåde. Copenhagen: J. H. Schultz forlag.

1837 births
1912 deaths
Danish jurists
Members of the Folketing
Speakers of the Landsting (Denmark)